Walter Judd may refer to:

Walter Judd (politician), American politician and physician
Walter Judd (footballer), English footballer
Walter Stephen Judd, American botanist and taxonomist